Sinohippus ("Chinese horse") is an extinct equid genus belonging to the subfamily Anchitheriinae.

References

Miocene horses
Prehistoric placental genera
Miocene mammals of Asia
Fossil taxa described in 1962